The Dowling Golden Lions were the athletic teams that represented Dowling College, located in Oakdale, Long Island, New York, in intercollegiate sports as a member of the Division II level of the National Collegiate Athletic Association (NCAA), primarily competing in the East Coast Conference (ECC; formerly known as the New York Collegiate Athletic Conference (NYCAC) until after the 2005–06 school year) from 1989–90 to 2015–16 for all sports (with the exception of men's golf and field hockey, which competed as independents).

Varsity teams
Dowling competed in 15 intercollegiate varsity sports: Men's sports included baseball, basketball, cross country, golf, lacrosse, soccer and tennis; while women's sports included basketball, cross country, field hockey, lacrosse, soccer, softball, tennis and volleyball. The school also offered cheerleading as a club sport.

National championships
In 2010, Dowling College's Men's Soccer, Men's Lacrosse, and Women's Volleyball teams all claimed NCAA Division II regional championships.

Individual teams

Baseball
Dowling College Men's Baseball earned a Division II regional championship in 2009, advancing to the Division II World Series.

Lacrosse
Dowling's Men's Lacrosse Team won the NCAA Division II National Championship in 2012.

Soccer
Dowling's Men's Soccer Team won the Division II National Championship in 2006, and again made it to the National Championship game in 2008.

References

External links